The Alliance of Independents, Ring of Independents, or National Ring of Independents, was a social liberal political party in Switzerland that existed between 1936 and 1999.

History of the party

Formation 
Gottlieb Duttweiler – the founder of Migros, a retail business and consumer cooperative – was dissatisfied with the state of Swiss politics in the 1930s and therefore founded the Alliance of Independents with a group of like-minded people. According to its statute, it was not meant to be a political party, but to be an association to help to reconcile capitalists and workers. From the beginning, the LdU also served the interests of the Migros cooperative, successfully lobbying against legislation that impeded its business model by restricting networks of general stores or sales by trucks (one of Migros' marketing strategies). The political scientist D.L. Seiler has therefore called it "a commercial enterprise continued by other means". The party won seven seats in the elections for the National Council of Switzerland in 1935 (although the seats were won in only 3 cantons of 26: 5 in Zürich, 1 each in St. Gallen and Bern). Since the original plan, to unite the best politicians of all parties in one group, did not work, the Alliance of Independents was transformed into a political party on December 30, 1936.

Duttweiler Era 
Duttweiler's authoritarian style of leadership combined with his vague political positions lead to a breakaway of leading figures from the party in 1943. These ran as Unabhängig-freie Liste (Eng: Independent- Free List) and won one seat in the elections for the National Council of Switzerland the following autumn. However this breakaway did not manage to exist for long. During the era of Duttweiler the party always won around 5% of the vote.  However the party was never successful in the French or Italian speaking regions of Switzerland or in central Switzerland (except in Lucerne).

Social Liberal Phase after Duttweiler 
After the death of longtime chairman Duttweiler in 1962, the party was able to establish itself as a social liberal alternative between the left and the right. It won 9.1% and 16 seats out of 200 in the 1967 elections to the National Council of Switzerland, thus becoming the strongest opposition party. The LdU was mainly voted for by urban middle-class voters (blue collar workers, civil servants). Several new local affiliates in different cantons were founded in this time. In the late 1970s a conflict over policy broke out in the party. The traditional opponents of the social market economy were confronted by a new ecologist wing of the party.

Green Liberal Phase 
In the mid-1980s the ecologist wing of the party became the most dominant. Already in 1982 members of the green and social liberal wings of the party resigned. Since the biggest financial backer of the party, Migros, had ideological problems with the ecological wing of the party it massively reduced its donations to the party. Due to financial problems the daily party newspaper Die Tat (The Deed) had to be converted to a weekly newspaper. The party lost its profile and its voters switched to new parties and protest groups (Green Party, Car Party).

Decline and Disbandment 
The party continued to lose more and more of its voters to the Social Democratic and Green parties. In the 1990s, the party tried unsuccessfully to win back these voters by returning to their social liberal roots.  Following numerous election loses and defections of prominent politicians to other parties, the LdU disbanded on December 4, 1999.

Chairmen 
 1936–1962 Gottlieb Duttweiler (Zürich)
 1962–1973  (Basel)
 1973–1978  (Basel-Country)
 1978–1985  (Zürich)
 1985–1992  (St. Gallen)
 1992–1996 Monika Weber (de) (Zürich) 
 1996–1998 Daniel Andres (Berne)
 1999 Anton Schaller (Zürich)

Notable politicians 
 Alfred Rasser (Aargau) 
 Sigmund Widmer (Zürich)

References 

Works cited
 J. Meynaud/A. Korff: Die Migros und die Politik. Der LdU. Zürich 1967
 H.G. Ramseier: Die Entstehung und Entwicklung des LdU bis 1943. Zürich, 1973
 E. Gruner: Die Parteien in der Schweiz. Bern, 1977
 Frank Wende: Lexikon zur Geschichte der Parteien in Europa. Seiten 614/615. Stuttgart 1981.

External links 
 
 Dossier Landesring der Unabhängigen 1987–2003 from Jahrbuch Schweizerische Politik

Defunct political parties in Switzerland
Liberal parties in Switzerland
Centrist parties in Switzerland
Green political parties in Switzerland
Green liberalism
Social liberal parties
1936 establishments in Switzerland
1999 disestablishments in Switzerland
Political parties established in 1936
Political parties disestablished in 1999